Monsters Unleashed may refer to:

 Monsters Unleashed (comics), a Marvel Comics series
 Scooby-Doo 2: Monsters Unleashed, a Scooby-Doo film